A duet is a musical composition for two performers in which the performers have equal importance to the piece, often a composition involving two singers or two pianists. It differs from a harmony, as the performers take turns performing a solo section rather than performing simultaneously. A piece performed by two pianists performing together on the same piano is a "piano duet" or "piano four hands". A piece for two pianists performing together on separate pianos is a "piano duo".

"Duet" is also used as a verb for the act of performing a musical duet, or colloquially as a noun to refer to the performers of a duet.

A musical ensemble with more than two solo instruments or voices is called trio, quartet, quintet, sextet, septet, octet, etc.

History 
When Mozart was young, he and his sister Marianne played a duet of his composition at a London concert in 1765. The four-hand, described as a duet, was in many of his compositions which included five sonatas; a set of variations, two performers and one instrument, and a sonata for two pianos. The first published sonata or duet was in 1777.

In Renaissance music, a duet specifically intended as a teaching tool, to be performed by teacher and student, was called a bicinium (see Étude).

In opera 
Duets have always been a part of the structure of operas. Early 16th-century operas such as L'Orfeo and L'incoronazione di Poppea involve duets throughout the performance. In 17th-century Italy duets were often used in comic scenes within serious operas. In Baroque France the duet was popular in tragedies, such as songs of vengeance and confrontation. The love duet was characterized by singing in close harmonies of 3rds and 6ths, symbolizing unity after conflict.

Famous operatic duets 
 La clemenza di Tito by Wolfgang Amadeus Mozart
 La Cenerentola by Gioachino Rossini
 The Puritans of Vincenzo Bellini
 Don Pasquale by Gaetano Donizetti
 La traviata by Giuseppe Verdi
 Aida of Giuseppe Verdi
 Mefistofele of Arrigo Boito
 Manon Lescaut by Giacomo Puccini
 Madama Butterfly by Giacomo Puccini
 L'amico Fritz by Pietro Mascagni

In pop music 

Throughout the 20th and 21st centuries, duets have been common in the popular music of their respective eras. In addition to a standard vocal duet, some songs have been written to be heard as conversations; for example, "Baby, It's Cold Outside". Other songs are performed around a theme; for example, New York City in "Empire State of Mind". Occasionally, duets are an improvisation between artists; for example, "Under Pressure" by Queen and David Bowie. Bowie and Queen frontman Freddie Mercury reportedly composed the lyrics in a day by improvising together. Duets are also common in musical movies and musical theatre; for example, the cinematic version of "Can You Feel the Love Tonight" from the 1994 movie The Lion King, or "Fit as a Fiddle" for the 1952 movie Singin' in the Rain and its corresponding play of the same name.

Virtual duet 
In addition to traditional duets performed live or in the studio, a so-called virtual duet can be created by having a singer (or musician) perform over the top of a pre-existing recording. Such a duet is a form of overdubbing. A virtual duet is sometimes done when the singer (or musician) of the original recording is deceased; for example, a live performance by Paul McCartney on "I’ve Got a Feeling" with an isolated vocal recording of John Lennon from The Beatles' famous rooftop performance, or a recording of Judy Garland being dubbed over by her daughter Lorna Luft on "Have Yourself A Merry Little Christmas". It can also be done with an earlier version of oneself (such as Yusuf / Cat Stevens on "Father And Son"); incidentally, Ronan Keating did his own virtual duet with Yusuf on the same song. Virtual dubbing may also be done live via video link or be constructed manually from two pre-existing recordings, generally where each singer/musician can have their own isolated audio channel in the form of a stem. Theoretically, a duet could be formed from two prerecorded singers or musicians so long as there are isolated audio channels from each artist.

Notable pop duets 
 "Baby, It's Cold Outside" – Ricardo Montalbán and Esther Williams, and with roles reversed, Red Skelton and Betty Garrett, 1948
 "Dream a Little Dream of Me" – Louis Armstrong and Ella Fitzgerald, 1950
 "Chaplin and Keaton Violin and Piano Duet" – Limelight, 1952
 "I Got You Babe" – Sonny & Cher, 1965
 "Ain't No Mountain High Enough" – Marvin Gaye and Tammi Terrell, 1967
 "Jackson" – Johnny Cash and June Carter, 1967
 "Somethin' Stupid" – Frank Sinatra and Nancy Sinatra, 1967
 "Waters of March" – Elis Regina and Antonio Carlos Jobim, 1972
 "Don't Go Breaking My Heart" – Elton John and Kiki Dee, 1976
 "You're The One That I Want" – John Travolta and Olivia Newton-John, 1978
 "Endless Love" – Diana Ross and Lionel Richie, 1981
 "Under Pressure" – Queen and David Bowie, 1981
 "Up Where We Belong" – Joe Cocker and Jennifer Warnes, 1982
 "Ebony and Ivory" – Paul McCartney and Stevie Wonder, 1982
 "Islands in the Stream" – Kenny Rogers and Dolly Parton, 1983
 "Say Say Say" – Paul McCartney and Michael Jackson, 1983
 "Don't Give Up" – Peter Gabriel and Kate Bush, 1986
 "Nothing's Gonna Stop Us Now" – Starship, 1987
 "Always" – Atlantic Starr, 1987
 "(I've Had) The Time of My Life" – Bill Medley and Jennifer Warnes, 1987
 "One Sweet Day" – Mariah Carey and Boyz II Men, 1995
 "Scream" – Michael Jackson and Janet Jackson, 1995
 "It's Your Love" – Tim McGraw and Faith Hill, 1997
 "Tell Him" – Barbra Streisand and Celine Dion, 1997
 "I'm Your Angel" – R. Kelly and Celine Dion, 1998
 "The Boy Is Mine" – Brandy and Monica, 1998
 "When You Believe" – Whitney Houston and Mariah Carey, 1998
 "Where You Are" – Jessica Simpson and Nick Lachey, 2000
 "Nobody Wants to Be Lonely" – Ricky Martin and Christina Aguilera, 2001
 "I Belong to You (Il ritmo della passione)" – Eros Ramazzotti and Anastacia, 2006
 "Beautiful Liar" – Beyoncé and Shakira, 2007
 "No Estamos Solos" – Eros Ramazzotti and Ricky Martin, 2007
 "Limpido" – Laura Pausini and Kylie Minogue, 2013
 "Hurt You" – Toni Braxton and Babyface, 2014
 "Bad Things" – Machine Gun Kelly and Camila Cabello, 2016

References

External links
 
 

 
Musical terminology